In computer science, a universal Turing machine (UTM) is a Turing machine that can simulate an arbitrary Turing machine on arbitrary input. The universal machine essentially achieves this by reading both the description of the machine to be simulated as well as the input to that machine from its own tape. Alan Turing introduced the idea of such a machine in 1936–1937. This principle is considered to be the origin of the idea of a stored-program computer used by John von Neumann in 1946 for the "Electronic Computing Instrument" that now bears von Neumann's name: the von Neumann architecture.

In terms of computational complexity, a multi-tape universal Turing machine need only be slower by logarithmic factor compared to the machines it simulates.

Introduction

Every Turing machine computes a certain fixed partial computable function from the input strings over its alphabet. In that sense it behaves like a computer with a fixed program. However, we can encode the action table of any Turing machine in a string. Thus we can construct a Turing machine that expects on its tape a string describing an action table followed by a string describing the input tape, and computes the tape that the encoded Turing machine would have computed. Turing described such a construction in complete detail in his 1936 paper:

Stored-program computer
Davis makes a persuasive argument that Turing's conception of what is now known as "the stored-program computer", of placing the "action table"—the instructions for the machine—in the same "memory" as the input data, strongly influenced John von Neumann's conception of the first American discrete-symbol (as opposed to analog) computer—the EDVAC. Davis quotes Time magazine to this effect, that "everyone who taps at a keyboard ... is working on an incarnation of a Turing machine", and that "John von Neumann [built] on the work of Alan Turing" (Davis 2000:193 quoting Time magazine of 29 March 1999).

Davis makes a case that Turing's Automatic Computing Engine (ACE) computer "anticipated" the notions of microprogramming (microcode) and RISC processors (Davis 2000:188). Knuth cites Turing's work on the ACE computer as designing "hardware to facilitate subroutine linkage" (Knuth 1973:225); Davis also references this work as Turing's use of a hardware "stack" (Davis 2000:237 footnote 18).

As the Turing Machine was encouraging the construction of computers, the UTM was encouraging the development of the fledgling computer sciences. An early, if not the very first, assembler was proposed "by a young hot-shot programmer" for the EDVAC (Davis 2000:192). Von Neumann's "first serious program ... [was] to simply sort data efficiently" (Davis 2000:184). Knuth observes that the subroutine return embedded in the program itself rather than in special registers is attributable to von Neumann and Goldstine. Knuth furthermore states that

Davis briefly mentions operating systems and compilers as outcomes of the notion of program-as-data (Davis 2000:185).

Some, however, might raise issues with this assessment. At the time (mid-1940s to mid-1950s) a relatively small cadre of researchers were intimately involved with the architecture of the new "digital computers". Hao Wang (1954), a young researcher at this time, made the following observation:

Wang hoped that his paper would "connect the two approaches". Indeed, Minsky confirms this: "that the first formulation of Turing-machine theory in computer-like models appears in Wang (1957)" (Minsky 1967:200). Minsky goes on to demonstrate Turing equivalence of a counter machine.

With respect to the reduction of computers to simple Turing equivalent models (and vice versa), Minsky's designation of Wang as having made "the first formulation" is open to debate. While both Minsky's paper of 1961 and Wang's paper of 1957 are cited by Shepherdson and Sturgis (1963), they also cite and summarize in some detail the work of European mathematicians Kaphenst (1959), Ershov (1959), and Péter (1958). The names of mathematicians Hermes (1954, 1955, 1961) and Kaphenst (1959) appear in the bibliographies of both Sheperdson-Sturgis (1963) and Elgot-Robinson (1961). Two other names of importance are Canadian researchers Melzak (1961) and Lambek (1961). For much more see Turing machine equivalents; references can be found at register machine.

Mathematical theory
With this encoding of action tables as strings, it becomes possible, in principle, for Turing machines to answer questions about the behaviour of other Turing machines. Most of these questions, however, are undecidable, meaning that the function in question cannot be calculated mechanically. For instance, the problem of determining whether an arbitrary Turing machine will halt on a particular input, or on all inputs, known as the Halting problem, was shown to be, in general, undecidable in Turing's original paper. Rice's theorem shows that any non-trivial question about the output of a Turing machine is undecidable.

A universal Turing machine can calculate any recursive function, decide any recursive language, and accept any recursively enumerable language. According to the Church–Turing thesis, the problems solvable by a universal Turing machine are exactly those problems solvable by an algorithm or an effective method of computation, for any reasonable definition of those terms.  For these reasons, a universal Turing machine serves as a standard against which to compare computational systems, and a system that can simulate a universal Turing machine is called Turing complete.

An abstract version of the universal Turing machine is the universal function, a computable function which can be used to calculate any other computable function. The UTM theorem proves the existence of such a function.

Efficiency
Without loss of generality, the input of Turing machine can be assumed to be in the alphabet {0, 1}; any other finite alphabet can be encoded over {0, 1}. The behavior of a Turing machine M is determined by its transition function. This function can be easily encoded as a string over the alphabet {0, 1} as well. The size of the alphabet of M, the number of tapes it has, and the size of the state space can be deduced from the transition function's table. The distinguished states and symbols can be identified by their position, e.g. the first two states can by convention be the start and stop states. Consequently, every Turing machine can be encoded as a string over the alphabet {0, 1}. Additionally, we convene that every invalid encoding maps to a trivial Turing machine that immediately halts, and that every Turing machine can have an infinite number of encodings by padding the encoding with an arbitrary number of (say) 1's at the end, just like comments work in a programming language. It should be no surprise that we can achieve this encoding given the existence of a Gödel number and computational equivalence between Turing machines and μ-recursive functions. Similarly, our construction associates to every binary string α, a Turing machine Mα.

Starting from the above encoding, in 1966 F. C. Hennie and R. E. Stearns showed that given a Turing machine Mα that halts on input x within N steps, then there exists a multi-tape universal Turing machine that halts on inputs α, x (given on different tapes) in CN log N, where C is a machine-specific constant that does not depend on the length of the input x, but does depend on Ms alphabet size, number of tapes, and number of states. Effectively this is an  simulation, using Donald Knuth's Big O notation. The corresponding result for space-complexity rather than time-complexity is that we can simulate in a way that uses at most CN cells at any stage of the computation, an  simulation.

Smallest machines
When Alan Turing came up with the idea of a universal machine he had in mind the simplest computing model powerful enough to calculate all possible functions that can be calculated. Claude Shannon first explicitly posed the question of finding the smallest possible universal Turing machine in 1956. He showed that two symbols were sufficient so long as enough states were used (or vice versa), and that it was always possible to exchange states for symbols. He also showed that no universal Turing machine of one state could exist.

Marvin Minsky discovered a 7-state 4-symbol universal Turing machine in 1962 using 2-tag systems. Other small universal Turing machines have since been found by Yurii Rogozhin and others by extending this approach of tag system simulation. If we denote by (m, n) the class of UTMs with m states and n symbols the following tuples have been found: (15, 2), (9, 3), (6, 4), (5, 5), (4, 6), (3, 9), and (2, 18).Kudlek and Rogozhin, 2002 Rogozhin's (4, 6) machine uses only 22 instructions, and no standard UTM of lesser descriptional complexity is known.

However, generalizing the standard Turing machine model admits even smaller UTMs. One such generalization is to allow an infinitely repeated word on one or both sides of the Turing machine input, thus extending the definition of universality and known as "semi-weak" or "weak" universality, respectively. Small weakly universal Turing machines that simulate the Rule 110 cellular automaton have been given for the (6, 2), (3, 3), and (2, 4) state-symbol pairs. The proof of universality for Wolfram's 2-state 3-symbol Turing machine further extends the notion of weak universality by allowing certain non-periodic initial configurations. Other variants on the standard Turing machine model that yield small UTMs include machines with multiple tapes or tapes of multiple dimension, and machines coupled with a finite automaton.

Machines with no internal states
If multiple heads are allowed on a Turing machine then no internal states are required; as "states" can be encoded in the tape. For example, consider a tape with 6 colours: 0, 1, 2, 0A, 1A, 2A. Consider a tape such as 0,0,1,2,2A,0,2,1 where a 3-headed Turing machine is situated over the triple (2,2A,0). The rules then convert any triple to another triple and move the 3-heads left or right. For example, the rules might convert (2,2A,0) to (2,1,0) and move the head left. Thus in this example, the machine acts like a 3-colour Turing machine with internal states A and B (represented by no letter). The case for a 2-headed Turing machine is very similar. Thus a 2-headed Turing machine can be Universal with 6 colours. It is not known what the smallest number of colours needed for a multi-headed Turing machine is or if a 2-colour Universal Turing machine is possible with multiple heads. It also means that rewrite rules are Turing complete since the triple rules are equivalent to rewrite rules. Extending the tape to two dimensions with a head sampling a letter and its 8 neighbours, only 2 colours are needed, as for example, a colour can be encoded in a vertical triple pattern such as 110.

Example of universal-machine coding
For those who would undertake the challenge of designing a UTM exactly as Turing specified see the article by Davies in Copeland (2004:103ff). Davies corrects the errors in the original and shows what a sample run would look like. He claims to have successfully run a (somewhat simplified) simulation.

The following example is taken from Turing (1936). For more about this example, see Turing machine examples.

Turing used seven symbols { A, C, D, R, L, N, ; } to encode each 5-tuple; as described in the article Turing machine, his 5-tuples are only of types N1, N2, and N3. The number of each "mconfiguration" (instruction, state) is represented by "D" followed by a unary string of A's, e.g. "q3" = DAAA. In a similar manner, he encodes the symbols blank as "D", the symbol "0" as "DC", the symbol "1" as DCC, etc. The symbols "R", "L", and "N" remain as is.

After encoding each 5-tuple is then "assembled" into a string in order as shown in the following table:

Finally, the codes for all four 5-tuples are strung together into a code started by ";" and separated by ";" i.e.:

This code he placed on alternate squares—the "F-squares" – leaving the "E-squares" (those liable to erasure) empty. The final assembly of the code on the tape for the U-machine consists of placing two special symbols ("e") one after the other, then the code separated out on alternate squares, and lastly the double-colon symbol "::" (blanks shown here with "." for clarity):

The U-machine's action-table (state-transition table) is responsible for decoding the symbols. Turing's action table keeps track of its place with markers "u", "v", "x", "y", "z" by placing them in "E-squares" to the right of "the marked symbol" – for example, to mark the current instruction z is placed to the right of ";"  x is keeping the place with respect to the current "mconfiguration" DAA. The U-machine's action table will shuttle these symbols around (erasing them and placing them in different locations) as the computation progresses:

Turing's action-table for his U-machine is very involved.

A number of other commentators (notably Penrose 1989) provide examples of ways to encode instructions for the Universal machine. As does Penrose, most commentators use only binary symbols i.e. only symbols { 0, 1 }, or { blank, mark | }. Penrose goes further and writes out his entire U-machine code (Penrose 1989:71–73). He asserts that it truly is a U-machine code, an enormous number that spans almost 2 full pages of 1's and 0's. For readers interested in simpler encodings for the Post–Turing machine the discussion of Davis in Steen (Steen 1980:251ff) may be useful.

Asperti and Ricciotti described a multi-tape UTM defined by composing elementary machines with very simple semantics, rather than explicitly giving its full action table. This approach was sufficiently modular to allow them to formally prove the correctness of the machine in the Matita proof assistant.

 Programming Turing machines 
Various higher level languages are designed to be compiled into a Turing machine.  Examples include Laconic and Turing Machine Descriptor.

See also
 Alternating Turing machine
 Von Neumann universal constructor – an attempt to build a self-replicating Turing machine
 Kleene's T predicate – a similar concept for µ-recursive functions
 Turing completeness

ReferencesGeneral references Original Paper Seminal papers Implementation Formal verification Other references'

.

 

 The first of Knuth's series of three texts.

  
)

External links

Turing machine